Wylie East High School (commonly Wylie East or WEHS) is a public high school located in Wylie, Texas (USA). It is classified as a 6A school by the UIL and is part of the Wylie Independent School District located in south central Collin County, serving mostly residents of Wylie as well as some residents of St Paul and Sachse.

In 2019, the school was rated an average of a 91.3 by the Texas Education Agency.

History
Wylie East High School opened for the 2007–2008 school year, serving only ninth grade students. District residents were asked to present suggestions at board meetings in late 2007 on whether to pursue multiple high schools, which the district voted in favor of in January 2008. Wylie East then began the 2009–2010 school year serving ninth and tenth grade students, and the Class of 2012 became the first class to graduate. The Class of 2011 (the school's first class) went on to graduate at Wylie High School.

Due to a $21 million bond passed in May 2012, the school underwent renovations and additions worth $18 million, making Wylie East the largest campus in Wylie ISD. These renovations added career and technology classrooms, science classrooms, 500 parking spaces, a field house, a band hall, and two gymnasiums.

Later, in May of 2019, Wylie East received a bond of $87 million, in order to make several more renovations to the school. These changes are adding hundreds of new classrooms, hallways, and a new gymnasium (named the Mike Williams Event Center, after the founding principal of the school). The renovations were completed in 2022.

Athletics
The Wylie East Raiders compete in the following sports:

Baseball
Basketball
Cross Country
Football
Golf
Powerlifting
Soccer
Softball
Swimming and Diving
Tennis
Track and Field
Volleyball
Wrestling

State Titles
Girls Soccer - 
2014(5A)

References

External links
 

Wylie Independent School District (Collin County, Texas) high schools
2007 establishments in Texas
Educational institutions established in 2007